Coptodactyla glabricollis is a dung rhinoceros beetle of the family Scarabaeidae.

Description
The basic colour is black or dark brown. Pronotum and elytra are strongly convex. Males have a small erect horn in the front of the head. Elytra are striated, with small punctures. Larvae are coprophagous.

Distribution
This species occurs in Australia (Northern Territory, Queensland, and Western Australia) and Papua New Guinea.

References
Biolib
Australian Biological Resources
Discover Life

Scarabaeidae
Beetles described in 1842